Busiris or Bousiris may mean refer to:

Places 
 Busiris (Lower Egypt), a large ancient city of Egypt, capital of its nome, and now a Catholic titular bishopric
 Busiris (Middle Egypt), an ancient city of Egypt, near the Egyptian Pyramids
 Busiris (Aphroditopolis), an ancient city of Egypt, southwest of Aphroditopolis
 Taposiris Magna (or Abusir or Busiris), an ancient port city of Egypt

Greek mythology 
 Busiris (Greek mythology), name of two personages

Arts 
 Busiris, a declamation by Isocrates referring to the above Egyptian king
 Busiris (play), a stage tragedy of 1719 by Edward Young

Ships 
  - one of several ships by that name

See also 
 Busiri (disambiguation)